"(Want You) Back in My Life Again" is a song by the popular group the Carpenters, the second single off their album Made in America, released in 1981. The song reached #72 on the U.S. Billboard Hot 100.  Its B-side was "Somebody's Been Lyin'", another song from the album.

This song also has the "synthesizer programming" of Daryl Dragon of Captain and Tennille fame.

Charts

References

External links
 

The Carpenters songs
1981 singles
Songs written by Kerry Chater
1981 songs
A&M Records singles